Pakistan National Council of the Arts (or PNCA) was set up to spearhead the development of arts in Pakistan by an Act of Parliament in 1973. It aims to build a robust arts ecosystem by creating an environment conducive to the flourishing of the arts, where the arts are accessible to everyone and artists and art groups have the commitment, financial support and resources, and to excel at home, and on the world stage. PNCA policies are framed by its Board of Governors which reports to the federal minister for National Heritage and Integration within the Ministry of Information.

Headquarters
It is based in Sector F-5/1, Islamabad, Pakistan.

Divisions
The Council is structured into four major divisions:

Visual Arts
The Visual Arts Division (VAD) was established /set up in 1974 initially named as “Plastic Arts Division”. The Division has two operational components, when initiated; The National Art Gallery  (NAG)  & Design Section (initially functioning in a residential facility and shifted to its permanent venue in 2007).

In July 2017, China's culture was showcased at the PNCA.

Performing Arts
Performing Arts Division of PNCA is mandated for the promotion and preservation of the Intangible Cultural Heritage. It is engaged in organizing different shows/ programmes representing provincial/ regional cultures/ heritage - (Dance, Music and Drama).

A National Music Festival was held to commemorate the 70th Independence Day of Pakistan in August 2017. 
The events were scheduled as follows:
 Day one - Performances by all classical singers from different parts of the country
 Day two - Performances by the Pakistani instrumentalists
 Day three - Performances by all the folk singers

Pictorial exhibitions
To celebrate the culture and heritage of Pakistan, pictorial exhibitions are also held at the PNCA. These picture displays capture folk heritage, traditional architecture and just routine life in Pakistan. 
In October 2017, a photo exhibition from Colombia titled 'Amazing Amazon' was held at PNCA.

Children Art Workshop
Pakistan National Council of the Arts has a section, Children Art Workshop. CAW organizes following colourful programmes round the year:

* Independence Day 14 August
* Pakistan Day 23 March
* Universal Children Day 21 November
* Speech Competition Day
* Naat Competition Day
* Singing Competition Day
* Mehfil-Millad Day

National Puppet Theatre
National Puppet Theatre was established in 1975. It was a great step taken by Pakistan National Council of the Arts, Ministry of Culture & Pakistan in order to revive the most popular folk art, which was dying due to negligence. Two groups were sent to China for Rod puppet training in 1975 & 1979 & a third was sent to Poland in 1987.Since then its quest to promote the art of puppetry, at home and in remote/ far flung areas of Pakistan, is in progress. NPT is carrying on its services to entertain/educate the children and norms through puppetry at home by conducting free puppet shows every Friday at Liaquat Memorial Hall, Rawalpindi in the past & is carrying on this legacy of entertainment even today every Monday at National Art Gallery, Islamabad with its eleven-member team. This team of National Puppet Theatre also holds shows every year to highlight important international events like Earthquake Victims Day, Kashmir Solidarity Day, Pakistan Day Celebrations, Independence Day Celebrations, World Tourism Day, and Universal Children Day & Quaid-e-Azam Day Celebrations.

Mission
In developing artistic talent, the Council provides total support through grants, training, arts housing, commissioning of work and overseas touring. Major festivals and arts shows are organized to showcase the best of local and international artists. New talents are identified and developed through music and writing competition. Annual awards are given to artists in recognition of their achievements and to patterns for arts sponsorship.
To build new audience and broaden arts participation, the Council engages the wider community in the arts through outreach programmes targeted at different sectors of the population. It also endorses arts education programmes for artists and arts groups.

See also 
 Ministry of Culture
 Foundation for Arts, Culture and Education

References

External links 
 Pakistan National Council of Arts Homepage

1973 establishments in Pakistan
Pakistan federal departments and agencies
Arts organisations based in Pakistan
Arts centres in Pakistan